Tardos is a village in Tata District in the county of Komárom-Esztergom, northern Hungary.

External links
 Street map (Hungarian)

Populated places in Komárom-Esztergom County